The Reign of Comus is a Renaissance painting painted by Lorenzo Costa for the Studiolo of Isabella d'Este in the Ducal Palace, Mantua. It is in tempera on canvas, and measures 152 cm (59.8 in) by 238 cm (93.7 in). It is now in the Louvre in Paris.

The first paintings for the Studiolo were completed by Andrea Mantegna, and he appears to have started this painting, but it was completed  by Costa between 1506 - 1511, after Mantegna's death, when Costa had been named court painter.

The iconography of this painting is complex. To the left of the foreground tree, a sitting Comus, the ruler of a land of bacchanals, with his head tilted looks at Venus. To his right, Apollo seems to serenade another sitting woman. In the center, Dionysus strokes the hair of a drunken maiden, identified as Nicaea. She had spurned his advances; and he overpowered her with wine in order to rape her. Meanwhile, to the right of an elaborate arch, Janus bifrons and Hermes shoo away poorly clothed figures from the enjoyments of Comus.

The elaborate painting may have a moral justifying some of the virtues of reveling, or perhaps it is a melancholic work which exalts as virtuous, only Nicaea, the one character oblivious to the orgies around her.

Other paintings of Isabella's Studiolo
 Allegory of Isabella d'Este's Coronation by Mantegna
 Parnassus by Mantegna
 Triumph of the Virtues by Mantegna
 Combat of Love and Chastity by Pietro Perugino

References

Paintings by Lorenzo Costa the Elder
Paintings in the Louvre by Italian artists
1511 paintings
Gonzaga art collection